Blouberg Nature Reserve is a protected area situated close to Vivo, west of Louis Trichardt in the Limpopo Province, of South Africa.

Topography and habitats
Its topography renders a diverse array of habitats which in turn accommodate numerous species of plant and animal life. This reserve is well known for the largest breeding colony of Cape vultures in South Africa in its mountainous sector. On the plain sector game is abundant with special mention of Cape buffalo, sable antelope and leopard. It is predominately bushveld savanna with Baobabs and Tamboti Trees standing prominently on the northern plains. Natural forest occurs on the mountain's southern slopes, which includes a large Outeniqua yellowwood, which was given official protection in 2013.

Visitor facilities
Current accommodation consists of chalets at Mashatu camp, Tamboti tented bush camp, Modumele Wilderness Camp and Molope Camp. A vehicle with high ground clearance is needed, especially for the southern part. Although it is an ideal stopover for the Tuli Block in Botswana, the Mapungubwe National Park on the Zimbabwe border or the northern part of Kruger Park, the reserve is worth a proper visit in itself.

Animals 
Animal species found in the reserve: 

Bird species found in the reserve:

Site locations

Main gate 
Office 
Mashatu camp 
Tamboti camp 
Molope camp 
Modumele camp 
Vulture Restaurant 
Big Tree 
Fig Forest 
Look-out point 
Fountain 
Rapanyana's Neck

See also 
 Protected areas of South Africa
 Blouberg (range)
Soutpansberg Conservancy

References

External links
Lepidopterists Society of Africa, Lepsoc.- Blouberg Nature Reserve
Major vegetation types of the Soutpansberg Conservancy and the Blouberg Nature Reserve, South Africa
Surrounding Area with map
Friends of Blouberg

Nature reserves in South Africa
Protected areas of Limpopo